Aguilar is a Spanish surname. Notable people with the surname include:

Abel Aguilar (born 1985), Colombian footballer
Alberto Aguilar (born 1960), Mexican footballer and manager
Alberto Aguilar Leiva (born 1984), Spanish footballer
Alejandro Aguilar (born 1990), Costa Rican footballer
Alfredo Aguilar (born 1988), Paraguayan footballer
Amalia Aguilar (1924–2021), Cuban and Mexican film actress and dancer in the 1940s and 1950s
Andrés Aguilar Mawdsley (1924-1995), Venezuelan lawyer and diplomat
Annette A. Aguilar (born 1957), American percussionist, bandleader, and educator
Antonio Aguilar Barraza (1919–2007), Mexican singer
Luis Aguilar-Monsalve (1942), Ecuadorian writer
António Maria de Aguilar (born 1978), Portuguese rugby player
Baron Diego Pereira d'Aguilar (1699–1759), Spanish Marrano
Belmer Aguilar (born 1973), Colombian footballer
Carlene Aguilar (born 1982), Filipino actress and former beauty queen
Carlos Aguilar (born 1988), American soccer player
Cynthia Aguilar–Villar (born 1950), Filipina politician
Christina Aguilar (born 1966), Thai pop singer
Daniel Aguilar (born 1998), Mexican footballer
Danny Aguilar (born 1986), Colombian footballer
Edwin Aguilar (born 1985), Panamanian footballer
Elías Aguilar (born 1991), Costa Rican footballer
Elisa Aguilar (born 1976), Spanish women's basketball player
Ephraim Lópes Pereira d'Aguilar, 2nd Baron d'Aguilar
Eugenio Aguilar (1804–1879), President of El Salvador 1846–1848
Everard F. Aguilar (1913 – 1966), Jamaican horticulturist and philatelist
Felipe Aguilar (born 1974), Chilean golfer
Francisco de Aguilar (conquistador) (1479–c. 1571), Spanish conquistador and later Dominican friar
Francisco de Aguilar (politician) (19th century), Acting President of Honduras 1855–1856
Francisco Javier Aguilar García (1949–2020), Spanish footballer
Florencio Flores Aguilar (contemporary), military ruler of Panama 1981–1982
Freddie Aguilar (contemporary), Filipino Pinoy rock musician
Gabriel Aguilar (born 1987), Bolivian footballer
Gerónimo de Aguilar (1489–c. 1531), 16th-century Spanish conquistador and translator for Hernán Cortés
Gloria Aguilar (born 1990), Guatemalan footballer
Gonzalo Aguilar (born 1987), Uruguayan footballer
Grace Aguilar (1816–1847), English novelist
Iván Aguilar (born 1991), Spanish footballer
Japeth Aguilar (born 1987), a Filipino basketball player
Jessica Aguilar (born 1982), Mexican American mixed martial artist
Jesús Aguilar (born 1990), Venezuelan professional baseball player
Joel Aguilar (born 1975), Salvadoran football referee
Jorge Aguilar (born 1985), Chilean tennis player
Jorge Aguilar (born 1993), Paraguayan footballer
Jorman Aguilar (born 1994), Panamanian footballer
José Aguilar (baseball) (born 1990), Mexican baseball player
José Aguilar (boxer) (1958–2014), Cuban boxer
José Aguilar (footballer) (born 2001), Spanish footballer
José Aguilar Álvarez (1902–1959), Mexican physician
José Alberto Aguilar Iñárritu (born 1954), Mexican politician
José Alejandro Aguilar López (born 1963), Mexican politician
José Antonio Aguilar Bodegas (born 1949), Mexican politician
José Marcos Aguilar Moreno (born 1935), Mexican politician
José Óscar Aguilar González (born 1957), Mexican politician
Josefina Aguilar (contemporary), Mexican folk artist
Juan Aguilar (born 1989), Paraguayan footballer
Juan Fernando López Aguilar (born 1961), Spanish politician and government minister
Juan Martínez de Jáuregui y Aguilar (1583–1641), Spanish poet
Julio Aguilar (born 1986), Paraguayan footballer
Kluiverth Aguilar (born 2003), Peruvian footballer
Lorena Aguilar (born 1985), Ecuadorian footballer
Luis Aguilar (soccer) (born 1984), American soccer defender
Luis Aguilar (actor) (1918–1997), Mexican actor and singer
Luis A. Aguilar (contemporary), commissioner of the U.S. Securities and Exchange Commission
Macarena Aguilar (born 1985), Spanish handballer
Manuel Aguilar (disambiguation)
Mario Aguilar (disambiguation)
Miguel Aguilar (born 1953), Bolivian footballer
Miguel Aguilar (born 1953), Salvadoran footballer and coach
Miguel Aguilar (born 1991), Mexican baseball player
Miguel Aguilar (born 1993), Mexican footballer
Mila D. Aguilar (contemporary), Filipina poet and revolutionary
Natasha Aguilar (born 1970), Costa Rican freestyle swimmer
Pablo Aguilar (disambiguation)
Paul Aguilar (born 1986), Mexican footballer
Pepe Aguilar, real name José Antonio Aguilar Jiménez (born 1968), Mexican-American singer-songwriter
Pepe Aguilar (born 1970), Spanish footballer
Rafael Aguilar Talamantes (1940–2016), Mexican politician
 Rafael María de Aguilar y Ponce de León, Spanish military officer and 56th Governor-General of the Philippines
Rafael Manzanares Aguilar (1918–1999), Honduran folklorist, author and composer
Robert Aguilar (1931–2020), former U.S. federal judge
Roberto Ivan Aguilar Gomez (contemporary), Bolivian politician
Ronnie Aguilar (born 1987), American basketball player
Rose Aguilar (contemporary), Californian broadcaster and journalist
Rotceh Aguilar (born 2001), Peruvian footballer
Ruben Aguilar (born 1993), French footballer
Ryan Aguilar (born 1994), American baseball player
Samuel Aguilar (1933–2013), Paraguayan footballer
Slick Aguilar (born 1954), American guitarist
Teresa Aguilar Suro (1931–2017), Mexican painter
Zach Aguilar (born 1998), American voice actor

For families 

Aguilar Family, early 20th century Native American potters from New Mexico

See also 
Aguiar, Portuguese variant

Spanish-language surnames